Desire Luzinda is a Ugandan US California-based recording, performing artiste, philanthropist, and founder of Desire Luzinda Foundation International (DLFI) established on June 5, 2021.

With influences from songbirds Mariah Carey and Whitney Houston, Desire Luzinda is an inspiring icon in society today. Luzinda sings in Luganda, English, and Swahili.

Early life
Born Racheal Desire Luzinda on 15 August 1980 at Mulago Referral Hospital, Desire Luzinda was raised in Uganda by her parents Mr. and Mrs. Luzinda. Desire Luzinda's father pursued education and was a Cabinet Minister during Amin's regime and a Member of the Legislature in the mid-90s.

Education
Desire Luzinda went to Buganda Road for Primary one to seven. She then joined Omega College and Makerere High School for A-level education.

Desire Luzinda enrolled for a bachelor's degree in Development Economics at Makerere University and stopped in year two following a busy music schedule.

In 2020, Desire Luzinda graduated as a Medical Assistant at San Leandro Adult School in California.

Radio and TV career
Desire Luzinda worked as a live media presenter with WBS TV from 2005 to 2007.

Desire later joined Dembe FM where she worked on an evening drive show with Kasuku, Mayende, and Orlando from February to October 2011 in Uganda Kampala.

Motherhood
Desire Luzinda is a mother of one, 'Michelle Heather Kaddu' who was born on 1 July 2004. Michelle was born in Uganda and lives in California, United States where she also goes to school.

Desire Luzinda put her music career on hold so that she could give her daughter all of her attention and focus on her growth.

Music career
Desire Luzinda's Afrobeat Pop music journey kicked off after high school. She went to Fenon events and recorded her first song 'Nakowa Emikwano' in 2006.

On Friday 13 June 2008, Desire Luzinda launched Nkomyewo debut EP at Hotel Africana featuring other acts like K-Lyinn (Tanzania), Juliana Kanyomozi, Bebe Cool, Bobi Wine, Blu*3, Jose Chameleone, Sarah Zawedde, Obsessions, and Qute Kaye.

More of her early releases include Mubite, Nyumirwa Nyo, Anything For You, Ddobo, Buliwendi, Stay With Me (Ft. D-BLACK), Lwaki, Tononya (Ft. Radio & Weasel), Nkyomyewo, Nina Omwami, Equation, Fitting (Ft. Radio & Weasel) and Kitone.

On 9 October 2013, Desire performed in Berlin, Germany, Holland (Netherlands), and other neighboring countries for the Independence festivals alongside Coco Finger.

On 6 June 2014, Desire held her maiden VIP music concert at the Kampala Serena Hotel dubbed 'Black and White' concert. Part of the proceeds went towards supporting the little angels in Ibanda Babies Home.
She partnered with companies KFM, NBS TV, Power Horse, Face TV, Silk Events, and Dembe FM to make this a success.

On 13 September 2014, Desire performed at the United Kingdom convention.
This live concert dubbed the ‘UK-Ugandan Affair’ featured other Ugandan artistes Judith Babirye and Ronald Mayinja at Troxy Arena in London.

In November 2014, Desire Luzinda was hosted on the Sporah TV show. The discussion was centered around Desire Luzinda's motherhood, music, and concerts all around the world.

On 10 March 2015, Desire Luzinda performed in Congo Brazzaville where she traveled with her band assemble to entertain her inter-continental fans based in Congo.

On 3 September 2016, Desire Luzinda performed for her South African fans at the third edition of Starqt Awards giving gala held at Legislature City Hall in Johannesburg South Africa.

On 8 December 2017 Desire performed as one of the main acts at The Abryanz Style and Fashion Awards 2017 at the Kampala Serena Hotel themed the Fashion Takeover, celebrating the business and entrepreneurial potential of the fashion industry in Africa. The event was hosted by Nana Akua and produced by South Africa's David Tlale alongside
Musicians Mafikizolo, Eddy Kenzo, and Sheebah Karungi .

On 3 August 2018, Desire Luzinda held the Transition Album Launch at Sky Lounge in Kampala.
Desire Luzinda said in a bid to turn her life around, it took her three years to make up her mind to become a born-again Christian.

'Transition' was a 17 track LP with songs Onkolela, Stood In The Gap, Lwakisa, Maanyi Gamukyala, Kale, Love Yo, Kimala, What a Man, Kiwujjo, Nyo Nyo Dala, Be There, Ziba Ziba, Ondeka, Never Let You Go, Nkwasaganya, Damn (Ft Choozen Blood) and Pocket Money. 'Transition' is available on platforms like iTunes, Apple Music, Amazon, Spotify, Shazam, YouTube, Deezer, Napster, and BoomPlay Music.

On 5 June 2021 at her NGO launch, Desire Luzinda performed with a 6 piece band. She had not performed for her local fans for many years.
The event was organized and publicized by Bryan Morel Publications. Production was done by Fenon events and the VIP coveted evening had guests marvel at the lighting and sound which gave the event a classy corporate feel.

Desire Luzinda performed covers of gospel songs like Imela by Nathaniel Basset featuring Enitan Adaba, Never Give Up by Tasha Cobbs Leonard, Because He Lives by Gaither Vocal Band, and Guy Penrod, Grace/ Call me Favour by Deborah Lukalu.

In attendance were Apostle Grace Lubega of Phaneroo Ministries, Hon. Amelia Kyambadde, Hon. Miria Matembe, Pastor Edwin Musiime, Hon. Nyeko Derick, amongst other eminent figures.

Challenges
On 11 November 2014, Desire Luzinda was interviewed by BBC’s Ugandan correspondent, Catherine Byaruhanga following a scandal where Desire Luzinda's estranged boyfriend leaked her private pictures. It was a trying time. How Desire Luzinda kept her head high and managed through is what made her a role model to many.
Desire Luzinda confirmed to BBC that her lawyers were looking into legal options at that time.

Achievements
Desire Luzinda has awards, certifications, and recognitions spanning her music and philanthropy including;
• HiPipo Music Awards Best Reggae song 2014 NOD
• Artiste of the Year Award in the African Crown Music Awards 2016 in Sweden.
• Abryanz Style and Fashion
Awards - Most Stylish Female Artiste 2016
• PAM Awards - Best New Artiste 2007
• PAM Awards - Best Female Artiste 2007
• PAM Awards - Best Afrobeat Single (Nyumirwa Nyo) 2008
• Desire Luzinda's Kitone song named among MTN CallerTunez Awards 2017
Rewarded for her works, including most downloaded caller tune on the MTN network.

Philanthropy and social work
Desire Luzinda is in activism. She is one of the few female artistes that have openly advocated for women's rights and menstrual health.

She began her singular charity operations in 2013 by assisting orphaned children at Uplift A child in Lungujja Kampala, Ibanda Babies Home, and many other outreaches that she organized to collect and donate items such as scholastic materials, beddings and food to this orphanage.

Girls, goals and cyberbullying
Due to the history that Desire Luzinda had with being bullied online as a public figure, she started using her story for the young generation to make the right choices when chasing their dreams. This is through Girls and Goals, a campaign she spearheaded in 2018 to fight stigma and depression that is caused by the pressures of girls' self-esteem.

Now based in California, USA, Desire Luzinda is using her fame and success to broaden her philanthropic and noble base.
On Saturday 5 June 2021 Desire Luzinda flew back to Uganda and launched her NGO dubbed Desire Luzinda Foundation International (DLFI) in a VIP coveted dinner at Kampala Serena Hotel hosting over 500 guests.

Desire chose to make it a norm to celebrate her birthday with those in need.
On 16 August 2021, Desire Luzinda, through DLFI partnered with Hairby Zziwa Salon and Academy to give the children a haircut and luncheon to celebrate yet another year of Desire Luzinda their patron.

The aim of the foundation is to attract more sustainable, predictable funding, simplify the process of accepting philanthropic contributions from friends, family, and well-wishers across the globe. The foundation works with other communities through projects in education, livelihood, agriculture, and cultural exchange.

International media attention
On 10 June 2021, Desire Luzinda shared her aftermath experience with revenge porn on BBC World Service, the world's leading public service broadcaster including BBC News Africa , BBC One which is UK 's most-watched channel, and the pioneering online-only youth service, BBC Three .

Appearing on BBC News Africa World Service's The Comb, Desire Luzinda made remarks to BBC Swahili reporter, Isaac Mumena and affirmed her new destiny that came from the challenges she went through, <<<update Ref. by Muhumuza Brian / Bryan Morel Publications.
Through her launched NGO , Desire Luzinda is still on a divine mission to share the wonderful work of God and inspire others. BBC recognized her for her motivational testimony and artistry as a whole.

References

1984 births
Living people
21st-century Ugandan women singers
People from Kampala
English-language singers from Uganda
Women singer-songwriters